Major General William Alan Beevor Steele,  (4 February 1895 – 20 January 1966) was a senior officer in the Australian Army during the Second World War.

References

External links
http://cas.awm.gov.au/photograph/116778 and/or http://www.awm.gov.au/collection/116778/
http://alh-research.tripod.com/2nd_light_horse_regiment_aif/index.album/lieutenant-william-alan-beevor-steele?i=16
http://alh-research.tripod.com/2nd_light_horse_regiment_aif/index.album/majorgeneral-william-alan-beevor-steele?i=17
http://www.geni.com/people/Maj-Gen-William-Steele/6000000016188560740
http://trove.nla.gov.au/result?q=%22William+Alan+Beevor+Steele%22
http://www.awm.gov.au/research/people/honours_and_awards/person/R1565709/
http://static.awm.gov.au/images/collection/items/ACCNUM_LARGE/RCDIG1068957/RCDIG1068957--787-.JPG

1895 births
1966 deaths
Australian Commanders of the Order of the British Empire
Australian generals
Australian military personnel of World War I
Australian Army personnel of World War II
Military personnel from Queensland
People from Gympie
Royal Military College, Duntroon graduates